Soloe trigutta is a moth in the family Erebidae. It is found in Sierra Leone and Zaire.

References

External links 
 Species info

Aganainae
Moths of Africa
Moths described in 1854